Defending champion Novak Djokovic defeated Rafael Nadal in the final, 6–3, 6–4 to win the men's singles tennis title at the 2013 China Open.

By reaching the final, Nadal regained the world No. 1 ranking from Djokovic.

Seeds

Draw

Finals

Top half

Bottom half

Qualifying

Seeds

Qualifiers

Qualifying draw

First qualifier

Second qualifier

Third qualifier

Fourth qualifier

References
 Main Draw
 Qualifying Draw

Open Mens Singles